Robert "Robbie" Kerr (born 26 September 1979 in High Wycombe, Buckinghamshire) is a British racing driver. In 2002, Kerr won the British Formula 3 championship.

Career

Early career

In 2002 he became the British Formula Three Champion for Alan Docking Racing with 306 points ahead of Australian racing driver James Courtney.

Following an abortive attempt at International Formula 3000 in 2003, Kerr did not race again until 2004 when he raced in the Formula Renault V6 Eurocup. At the opening round at Monza Kerr had earned pole position but mechanical problems forced him out. He eventually won a race at the last race of the season in Valencia. He had not led the race until he took the lead on the last lap.

Kerr has also raced in the Le Mans Endurance Series. In one of the most impressive debuts the series has seen he raced at Silverstone in a Zytek 04S P1 and was partnered by American Chris Dyson. He took pole position from the Audi R8s of Allan McNish and Johnny Herbert by more than 1.6 seconds. Kerr eventually finished 4th but set the fastest lap of the race.

A1 Grand Prix
In 2005 Kerr became the lead driver for A1 Team Great Britain, partner to Alex Lloyd. Robbie raced in the 2005–06 rounds except the season finale in China, and came close to winning on several occasions. At the feature race at the inaugural round at Brands Hatch after a successful pitstop he was in the lead ahead of A1 Team Brazil until the battery failed in his car.

At Dubai Autodrome he had the lead for most of the feature race until he was passed by A1 Team France's Nicolas Lapierre. Kerr performed well in the next round on the Durban street circuit, South Africa, where he finished second in the sprint race, and held the lead briefly in the early stages of the feature race, only for a pipe to get lodged underneath the car in his pit stop, he came in again on the next lap to get it removed but damage to the floor of the car led to Kerr's retirement.

He then took A1 Team Great Britain's first ever A1 Grand Prix pole position in the next round in Indonesia, but he lost out in the races, failing to turn those pole positions into a win, and in Mexico he struggled in qualifying, ended up down the order in unfamiliar territory, and just missing out on the points in the sprint race in 11th, but improving in the feature race to 6th position. At Mazda Raceway Laguna Seca Kerr raced his last two races for A1 Team Great Britain in the season. In a rain-sodden sprint race Kerr finished 4th behind Mexico, France and Portugal. In the feature race he finished 3rd behind Mexico and A1 Team Germany. Kerr did not race at Shanghai to prepare for the 2006 World Series by Renault, and his place was taken by Indy Racing League driver Darren Manning.

The following season, Kerr returned to Team GBR for A1GP, though his World Series by Renault commitments (see below) prevented him from making the first round of the season at Zandvoort. He was again replaced by Manning. For this whole season, Kerr will be supported by Manning and young British Formula 3 star Oliver Jarvis.

Formula Renault 3.5
For the 2006 season, Kerr joined Sean McIntosh in the KTR team racing in the 2006 Formula Renault 3.5 Series season.  Success was limited during the season with a best finish of 4th, then a fastest lap in the final round, resulting in a 17th finish in the overall standing.

Other drives
Since the solitary season of Formula Renault, Kerr has driven only sporadically and across different series.  He had several sportscar outings in 2008 and 2009, a guest drive at the Silverstone round of the Porsche Carrera Cup in 2010 and a season of the Speed Euroseries in 2011.  Kerr returned to sportscars in 2012 and 2013 picking up some drives in the FIA World Endurance Championship with a 2nd place in the LMP2 class at Interlagos.

Racing record

Complete A1 Grand Prix results
(key) (Races in bold indicate pole position) (Races in italics indicate fastest lap)

Complete Formula Renault 3.5 Series results
(key) (Races in bold indicate pole position) (Races in italics indicate fastest lap)

† Driver did not finish the race, but was classified as he completed more than 90% of the race distance.

24 Hours of Le Mans results

References

External links
Official website of Robbie Kerr 
Robbie Kerr biography

English racing drivers
British Formula Renault 2.0 drivers
Formula Renault V6 Eurocup drivers
A1 Team Great Britain drivers
British Formula Three Championship drivers
International Formula 3000 drivers
Formula Palmer Audi drivers
24 Hours of Le Mans drivers
Sportspeople from High Wycombe
1979 births
Living people
American Le Mans Series drivers
European Le Mans Series drivers
World Series Formula V8 3.5 drivers
Porsche Supercup drivers
FIA World Endurance Championship drivers
Porsche Carrera Cup GB drivers
Arden International drivers
Victory Engineering drivers
KTR drivers
A1 Grand Prix drivers
Super Nova Racing drivers
Highcroft Racing drivers
Alan Docking Racing drivers